Zvi Sobolofsky is a rosh yeshiva at Yeshiva University in New York City.

Rabbi Sobolofsky studied at Yeshivat Kerem B'Yavneh and Yeshiva University; graduating in 1987, he was named valedictorian of the Mazer Yeshiva Program.  He then attended the Rabbi Isaac Elchanan Theological Seminary (RIETS), finishing in 1990 and graduated from the Azrieli Graduate School of Jewish Education and Administration in 1996.

He was appointed Rosh Yeshiva in the spring of 2002 and began teaching Talmud at Yeshiva University and its affiliated RIETS in the fall of that year. His shiur has gained much popularity in its short existence, and is currently one of the most popular shiurim in the Yeshiva. Some credit this popularity to his ability to blend the teaching styles of his two teachers, Rabbi Mordechai Willig and Rabbi Hershel Schachter. Rabbi Willig is known for his focus towards practical understanding and Rabbi Schachter is known for his ability to present topics in the Talmud in a broader context. Rabbi Sobolofsky blends these two styles to form a unique package that many students find most rewarding. 
In addition to his role as Rosh Yeshiva in RIETS, Rabbi Sobolofsky also serves as the spiritual leader of Congregation Ohr HaTorah in Bergenfield, New Jersey, where he is a resident. His synagogue has attracted many Orthodox Jews to the community. Rabbi Sobolofsky also lectures at the Bergen County Beis Medrash Program (BCBM) housed at Congregation Bnai Yeshurun in Teaneck, New Jersey.

Prior to his appointment as Rosh Yeshiva, Rabbi Sobolofsky was a fellow of the Gruss Kollel Elyon and then went on to teach in Yeshiva University's Stone Beis Medrash Program (SBMP) for seven years.

During the summer months, Rabbi Sobolofsky served as Rosh Kollel for the Beis Medrash Program at Camp Morasha. In the summer 2008, he joined Roshei Yeshiva, Rabbi Hershel Schachter and Rabbi Mayer Twersky at the NCSY Kollel in Israel.

Published works
Rabbi Sobolofsky is the author of a sefer, Reishis Koach, on Maseches Bechoros, as well as a book published by YU Press about the laws of Niddah.
He is also a regular contributor to TorahWeb, where he has published many articles on the Weekly Torah Portion and Yomim Tovim.

References

External links
 TorahWeb articles and audio/video shiurim
 Shiurim by Rabbi Zvi Sobolofsky

Living people
People from Bergenfield, New Jersey
Rabbi Isaac Elchanan Theological Seminary semikhah recipients
Yeshiva University rosh yeshivas
Modern Orthodox rabbis
American Orthodox rabbis
Year of birth missing (living people)